The Trojan Room coffee pot was a coffee machine located in the Computer Laboratory of the University of Cambridge, England. Created in 1991 by Quentin Stafford-Fraser and Paul Jardetzky, it was migrated from their laboratory network to the web in 1993 becoming the world's first webcam.

To save people working in the building the disappointment of finding the coffee machine empty after making the trip to the room, a camera was set up providing a live picture of the coffee pot to all desktop computers on the office network. After the camera was connected to the Internet a few years later, the coffee pot gained international renown as a feature of the fledgling World Wide Web, until it was retired in 2001.

Development 
The 128×128 px greyscale camera was connected to the laboratory's local network through a video capture card fitted on an Acorn Archimedes computer. Researcher Quentin Stafford-Fraser wrote the client software, dubbed XCoffee and employing the X Window System protocol, while his colleague Paul Jardetzky wrote the server program.

In 1993, web browsers gained the ability to display images, and it soon became clear that this would be an easier way to make the picture available to users. The camera was connected to the Internet and the live picture became available via HTTP in November of the same year, by computer scientists Daniel Gordon and Martyn Johnson. It therefore became visible worldwide and grew into a popular landmark of the early web.

Retirement 

Following the laboratory's move to its current premises, the camera was eventually switched off, at 09:54 UTC on 22 August 2001. Coverage of the shutdown included front-page mentions in The Times and The Washington Post, as well as articles in The Guardian and Wired.

The last of the four or five coffee machines seen online, a Krups, was auctioned on eBay for £3,350 to the German news website Spiegel Online. The pot was later refurbished pro bono by Krups employees, and was switched on again in the magazine's editorial office. Since the summer of 2016, the coffee maker is on permanent loan to the Heinz Nixdorf MuseumsForum in Paderborn.

Legacy and cultural references 
Spoofs of the Trojan Room coffee machine ranged from the Hyper Text Coffee Pot Control Protocol,  a 1998 April Fools' Day specification for a communication protocol, to  the 2002 video game Hitman 2: Silent Assassin, in which the player can destroy a "coffee camera" in a kitchen as a distraction. The coffee pot was also mentioned in the BBC Radio 4 drama The Archers on 24 February 2005.

In the first episode of the fourth season of AMC's Halt and Catch Fire, the coffee pot is shown to depict the first webcam showing up on the emerging World Wide Web.

References

Further reading

External links 
 Trojan Room Coffee Machine original website and evolution timeline
 Internet archive of the site
 New coffee pot webcam at the offices of Spiegel Online
 
 Heinz Nixdorf Museum Paderborn - CoffeeCam Live View
 YouTube Computerphile Interview with Quentin Stafford-Fraser
 YouTube - The Centre for Computing History interview with Quentin Stafford-Fraser

Internet properties established in 1991
Internet properties disestablished in 2001
British websites
Cooking appliances
Defunct websites
History of Cambridge
Internet culture
University of Cambridge Computer Laboratory
1991 establishments in England
2001 disestablishments in England